Dupuyer Creek is a tributary of Birch Creek in northwestern Montana in the United States.

It rises at the confluence of the South Fork, Middle Fork and North Fork in the Lewis and Clark National Forest east of the continental divide in northwestern Teton County at an elevation near 4750 feet.

See also

List of rivers of Montana
Montana Stream Access Law

References

Rivers of Montana
Bodies of water of Teton County, Montana
Bodies of water of Pondera County, Montana